Football Federation of Volyn is a football governing body in the region of Volyn Oblast, Ukraine. The federation is a member of the Football Federation of Ukraine.

Previous Champions

1948    FC Spartak Lutsk (1)
1949    FC Lokomotyv Kivertsi (1)
1950    FC Lokomotyv Kovel (1)
1951    FC Dynamo Kovel (1)
1952    FC Dynamo Lyuboml (1)
1953    FC Dynamo Lutsk (1)
1954    FC Dynamo Lyuboml (2)
1955    FC Kolhospnyk Horokhiv (1)
1956    FC Volodymyr-Volynskyi (1)
1957    FC Volodymyr-Volynskyi (2)
1958    FC Lutsk (1)
1959    GDO Lutsk (1)
1960    FC Shakhtar Novovolynsk (1)
1961    FC Zenit Volodymyr-Volynskyi (1)
1962    FC Zenit Volodymyr-Volynskyi (2)
1963    FC Zenit Volodymyr-Volynskyi (3)
1964    FC Shakhtar Novovolynsk (2)
1965    FC Shakhtar Novovolynsk (3)
1966    FC Lokomotyv Kovel (2)
1967    FC Elektryk Lutsk (1)
1968    FC Rubin Kovel (1)
1969    FC Shakhtar Novovolynsk (4)
1970    FC Spartak Kovel (1)
1971    FC Lokomotyv Kovel (3)
1972    FC Silmash Kovel (1)
1973    FC Silmash Kovel (2)
1974    FC Shakhtar Novovolynsk (5)
1975    FC Silmash Kovel (3)
1976    FC Shakhtar Novovolynsk (6)
1977    FC Prylad Lutsk (1)
1978    FC Prylad Lutsk (2)
1979    FC Prylad Lutsk (3)
1980    FC Silmash Kovel (4)
1981    FC Pidshypnyk Lutsk (1)
1982    FC Silmash Kovel (5)
1983    FC Silmash Kovel (6)
1984    FC Silmash Kovel (7)
1985    FC Pidshypnyk Lutsk (2)
1986    FC Pidshypnyk Lutsk (3)
1987    FC Pidshypnyk Lutsk (4)
1988    FC Pidshypnyk Lutsk (5)
1989    FC Pidshypnyk Lutsk (6)
1990    FC Pidshypnyk Lutsk (7)
1991    FC Pidshypnyk Lutsk (8)
1992    FC Pidshypnyk Lutsk (9)
1992-93 FC Pidshypnyk Lutsk (10)
1993-94 FC Pidshypnyk Lutsk (11)
1994-95 FC Kovel (1)
1995-96 FC ENKO Lutsk (1)
1996-97 FC Yavir Tsuman (1)
1997-98 FC ENKO Lutsk (2)
1998-99 FC Yavir Tsuman (2)
1999    FC Pidshypnyk Lutsk (12)
2000    FC Yavir-Volynlis Tsuman (3)
2001    FC Yavir-Volynlis Tsuman (4)
2002    FC Svityaz Shatsk (1)
2003    FC Kovel (2)
2004    FC Kovel (3)
2005    FC Kovel (4)
2006    FC Votrans-LSTM Lutsk (1)
2007    FC Votrans-LSTM Lutsk (2)
2008    MFC Kovel (5)
2009    MFC Kovel-Volyn (6)
2010    MFC Kovel-Volyn (7)
2011    FC Votrans-LSTM Lutsk (3)
2012-13 MFC Kovel-Volyn (8)
2013-14 FC Laska Boratyn (1)
2014-15 FC Lutsksantekhmontazh-536 (1)
2015-16 FC Lutsksantekhmontazh-536 (2)
2016-17 FC Lutsksantekhmontazh-536 (3)
2017-18 FC Lutsksantekhmontazh-536 (4)
2018-19 FC Votrans Lutsk (4)
2019-20 FC Shakhtar Novovolynsk (7)

Top winners
12 – FC Pidshypnyk Lutsk 
 8 – MFC Kovel-Volyn 
 7 – 2 clubs (Silmash, Shakhtar N.)
 4 – 3 clubs (Yavir-Volynlis, LSTM-536, Votrans)
 3 – 3 clubs (Prylad, Lokomotyv Kovel, Zenit)
 2 – 3 clubs
 1 – 12 clubs

Professional clubs
 FC Dynamo Lutsk, 1946
 FC Volyn Lutsk (Torpedo), 1960–1971, 1977–
 FC Shakher Novovolynsk, 1968 (a season)
 FC Kovel-Volyn Kovel, 2001–2003 (two seasons)

See also
 FFU Council of Regions

References

External links
 Volyn Oblast. Ukrayinskyi Football 
 Historical overview. Football Federation of Volyn 

Football in the regions of Ukraine
Football governing bodies in Ukraine
Sport in Volyn Oblast